The 1900 Brown Bears football team represented Brown University as an independent during the 1900 college football season. Led by third-year head coach Edward N. Robinson, Brown compiled a record of 7–3–1. The team's captain was L. Washburn.

Schedule

References

Brown
Brown Bears football seasons
Brown Bears football